Mantshwabisi is a village in Kweneng District of Botswana. It is located 45 km north-west of Molepolole, along the Molepolole–Letlhakeng road. The population of Mantshwabisi was 464 in 2001 census.

References

Kweneng District
Villages in Botswana